The American Museum of Nursing was part of Arizona State University College of Nursing.  It was located in Tempe, Arizona, United States.  It featured exhibits of uniforms, posters, medical care items, photographs and other nursing memorabilia, a research library, rare document room, and an archive.  The collections are now part of the International Nursing Museum in Scottsdale, Arizona, which is seeking a permanent location.

External links

 American Museum of Nursing
 Listing at the Central Arizona Museum Association

Nursing museums in the United States
Defunct museums in Arizona
Museums established in 1993